is a song recorded by Japanese singer Shizuka Kudo, released as a single through Pony Canyon on June 5, 1996. It featured as the theme song on the ninth and penultimate installment of the Gokudō no Onna-tachi Yakuza film series, Gokudō no Onna-tachi: Kiken na Kake (1996), starring Kudo herself.

The coupling song "Luna (Tsuki no Megami)", which was first included on Kudo's album, Doing, a month prior, is the theme song to the film Bakusō! Moon Angel: Kita e (1996), starring Kudo as a female truck driver in her first cinematic role since Future Memories: Last Christmas. The song was recut as a B-side to "Yū" to promote the film.

"Yū" is the third and last in a consecutive trilogy of singles with one-character titles: "Yū" is preceded by "Chō" and "7".

Background
"Yū" is a ballad co-written by Kudo, under the pseudonym Aeri, and Hideya Nagazaki. It is written in the key of C-sharp minor and set to a tempo of 70 beats per minute. Kudo's vocals span one octave, from B3 to B4. The song represents Kudo's heartfelt ode to her mother. Lyrically, it describes the strength of a mother and the greatness she brings to the narrator's life.

Critical reception
Kudo sings about needing her love and wanting to learn the workings of her mother's heart. Kudo was praised for her emotional vocal performance. TV personality Ayako Nishikawa has listed the song as one of her personal favorites.

Chart performance
The single debuted at number 26 on the Oricon Singles Chart with 20,000 copies sold in its first week, becoming Kudo's first single to peak outside of the top 20. It stayed in the top 100 for a total of seven weeks.

Track listing

Charts

References

1990s ballads
1996 songs
1996 singles
Pop ballads
Songs with lyrics by Shizuka Kudo
Songs written for films
Shizuka Kudo songs
Pony Canyon singles